Post Falls is a city in Kootenai County, Idaho, between Coeur d'Alene and Spokane, Washington. It is a suburb of Coeur d'Alene, to the east, and a bedroom community to Spokane, to the west. The population was 38,485 at the time of the 2020 census, up from 17,247 in the 2000 census, making it Idaho's tenth-largest city.

History

Post Falls is named after Frederick Post, a German immigrant who constructed a lumber mill along the Spokane River in 1871 on land he purchased from Andrew Seltice, Chief of the Coeur d'Alene Tribe. The purchase of the land is preserved in a pictograph on a granite cliff in Treaty Rock Park.

Geography

Post Falls is located on the Rathdrum Prairie, along the Washington–Idaho border. It is bounded by Coeur d’Alene to the east, Stateline and the state of Washington to the west, and the Spokane River to the south.

Climate
Post Falls has a dry-summer continental climate (Dsa), with four very distinct seasons.

Education
The public schools are run by the Post Falls School District #273. Other schools within Post Falls include:
 Classical Christian Academy
 Frederick Post Kindergarten
 Greensferry Elementary
 Genesis Prep Academy
 Mullan Trail Elementary
 Ponderosa Elementary
 Prairie View Elementary
 Seltice Elementary
 Treaty Rock Elementary
 West Side Elementary
 West Ridge Elementary
 Post Falls Middle School
 Immaculate Conception Academy
 River City Middle School
 Post Falls High School
 New Vision Alternative High School
 Riverbend Professional Technical Academy
 Calvary Chapel Bible College Northwest
 North Idaho College Workforce Training Center
 St. Dominic School

Demographics

As of 2009 the per capita income for the city was $32,696.

2010 census
As of the census of 2010, there were 27,574 people, 10,263 households, and 7,396 families living in the city. The racial makeup of the city was 94.0% White, 0.4% African American, 0.9% Native American, 0.7% Asian, 0.1% Pacific Islander, 1.0% from other races, and 2.8% from two or more races. Hispanic or Latino of any race were 4.6% of the population.

There were 10,263 households, of which 40.2% had children under the age of 18 living with them, 53.7% were married couples living together, 12.7% had a female householder with no husband present, 5.7% had a male householder with no wife present, and 27.9% were non-families. 21.9% of all households were made up of individuals, and 7.9% had someone living alone who was 65 years of age or older. The average household size was 2.68 and the average family size was 3.10.

The median age in the city was 33 years. 29% of residents were under the age of 18; 8.7% were between the ages of 18 and 24; 28.6% were from 25 to 44; 22.4% were from 45 to 64; and 11.3% were 65 years of age or older. The gender makeup of the city was 48.8% male and 51.2% female.

2000 census
As of the census of 2000, there were 17,247 people, 6,369 households, and 4,668 families living in the city. The racial makeup of the city was 96.13% White, 0.18% African American, 0.87% Native American, 0.56% Asian, 0.06% Pacific Islander, 0.60% from other races, and 1.61% from two or more races. Hispanic or Latino of any race were 2.55% of the population.

There were 6,369 households, out of which 40.2% had children under the age of 18 living with them, 58.7% were married couples living together, 10.1% had a female householder with no husband present, and 26.7% were non-families. 20.5% of all households were made up of individuals, and 8.2% had someone living alone who was 65 years of age or older. The average household size was 2.71 and the average family size was 3.13.

In the city, the population was spread out, with 30.6% under the age of 18, 8.9% from 18 to 24, 31.8% from 25 to 44, 18.9% from 45 to 64, and 9.8% who were 65 years of age or older. The median age was 31 years. For every 100 females, there were 95.8 males. For every 100 females age 18 and over, there were 92.4 males.

The median income for a household in the city was $39,061, and the median income for a family was $42,758. Males had a median income of $32,284 versus $22,798 for females. The per capita income for the city was $18,692. About 7.1% of families and 9.4% of the population were below the poverty line, including 13.4% of those under age 18 and 7.5% of those age 65 or over.

Economy

Due to the proximity of numerous lakes, rivers and mountains, Post Falls has developed tourism and retirement communities. There is an increasing number of retail, dining and entertainment businesses locating in the City.

Kootenai County traditionally has had a timber-based economy. That is changing gradually, as the manufacturing base has become more diverse. Jobs Plus, Inc., the local economic development organization has recruited several small to medium-sized firms to the county. Manufacturing jobs are found primarily in electronics, lumber and furniture at the present. Post Falls was the chosen location for Flexcel, Inc., a major furniture manufacturer that relocated to North Idaho nearly fifteen years ago and employs a workforce of 350. This was done with the help of Jobs Plus, Inc. and by creating an Urban Renewal District to help build infrastructure. This District closed out at the end of December 2001. Jobs Plus, Inc. has also just recently helped bring Center Partners, a call center business (employing a workforce of 300), and Buck Knives brought their manufacturing headquarters (workforce of 250) to the City. Also, Wal-Mart opened its new store in January 2002, employing a workforce of 300.

Construction of a private surgical hospital was completed in 2004. Sysco foods opened their distribution plant during 2005. This project was made possible by Jobs Plus, Urban Renewal, and the City working together. Also, a community development block grant for $500,000 was used to help fund a water tower (approximately $1,500,000 total cost) that was needed on the west side of town for development in that area. In 2007, Cabela's opened its doors to a beautiful  retail store. Considerable economic development activity transpired in Post Falls in 2009 including the opening of ALK Source Materials/Biopol which is a Danish pharmaceutical company, a second Super Wal-Mart store that will be located near the new Cabelas store began its construction and is slated to open in early summer 2010, and Lowe's Home Improvement finalized the purchase of land adjacent to the new Wal-Mart at the Pointe at Post Falls. In 2010, additional commercial real estate activity is anticipated including the construction of the Lowe's Home Improvement store mentioned earlier; a new 30,000 professional office building to house a company named Ednetics; a 30,000 LEED certified industrial building to be the home of a subsidiary of Berg Integrated Systems will begin construction in early 2010; the State of Idaho Department of Labor will construct their new regional office here in Post Falls that will provide services to the northern five counties of Idaho; several restaurants are also anticipated to locate within the Pointe at Post Falls regional power center to take advantage of the retail traffic of Cabela's and Wal-Mart; the City's downtown area is expected to see a major mixed-use project also take off with infrastructure and the first phase including a hospitality component begin construction; and finally the community anticipates that construction on the Beck Road Interchange with Interstate 90 will begin this fall ultimately providing service to the Pointe at Post Falls and EXPO on the north side of the freeway and the Riverbend Commerce Park and Greyhound Event Center on the south side of Interstate 90.

Employers
Major employers in Post Falls in 2009 were:

Transportation
  - Interstate 90 - Spokane (west), Coeur d'Alene (east)

Air passenger service is available at Spokane International Airport, west of Spokane. Amtrak passenger rail service is available in Spokane and Sandpoint. Bus service and taxi service are available in the immediate area.

References

External links

Post Falls Chamber of Commerce
Post Falls School District #273

 
Populated places established in 1871
Cities in Idaho
Cities in Kootenai County, Idaho
1871 establishments in Idaho Territory